Emokweme is a town in Weppa Wanno Kingdom of Edo state, Nigeria with a population of approximately 20,000 people.

The people speak Etsako with Weppa Wanno dialect.

Emokweme, alongside their other siblings of Igegbode, Unueda make up the iviokpisa kinship group of Weppa Wanno, and they are the original settlers at Agenebode.

The present traditional Ruler 'Okumagbe' of Weppa Wanno Kingdom  Dr.Oshiapi Egabor is from Emokweme (Iviokpisa kinship group)

Populated places in Edo State